Propeller Island (also published as The Floating Island, or The Pearl of the Pacific, and as The Self-Propelled Island) is a science fiction novel by French author Jules Verne (1828–1905). It was first published in 1895 as part of the Voyages Extraordinaires. It relates the adventures of a French string quartet in Milliard City, a city on a massive ship in the Pacific Ocean, inhabited entirely by millionaires.

Plot

A French string quartet (Sébastien Zorn, Frascolin, Yvernes and Pinchinat), traveling from San Francisco to their next engagement in San Diego, is diverted to Standard Island. Standard Island is an immense man-made island designed to travel the waters of the Pacific Ocean. The wealth of residents of the island can only be measured in millions. The quartet is hired to play a number of concerts for the residents during their tour of the islands (Sandwich, Cook, Society) of the South Pacific. The island seems an idyllic paradise; however, it is an island divided in two. The left half's population is led by Jem Tankerdon and is known as the Larboardites. The right half's population is led by Nat Coverley and is known as the Starboardites. Despite the obstacles encountered on their journey, the two parties have a disagreement that threatens the future of the island itself.

English versions
In October, 1896 Sampson Low (London) published the novel as The Floating Island, or The Pearl of the Pacific, translated by W. J. Gordon, with 80 illustrations. While Gordon was an accomplished translator, boy's author, and literary figure with an accurate translation of Verne's The Giant Raft to his credit, the dark social commentary of Propeller Island did not sit well with his publishers, and numerous alterations in the text were made. As Arthur B. Evans notes:

Gordon's translation was also used for the only fully illustrated American edition of the book, published in November 1897 by W. L. Allison. Other publishers were Hurst and Company and the Donahue Brothers.

In 1967 Sidgwick and Jackson (London) published an abbreviated version of the work in the Fitzroy Edition as Propellor Island. In 1990, Keegan Paul (US) republished the Allison edition of The Floating Island without illustrations and with an introduction by Kaori O'Connor.

In 2015, Professor Marie-Thérèse Noiset of the University of North Carolina translated the book complete with the previously excised passages. Unusually, Verne's original was written in the present tense, but Noiset's release delivered the story in the past tense, which is the most common narrative time used in the writing of fiction. She explained, "In order for my translation to read smoothly, the Pacific Islands encountered in the novel have been given their present-day names, the measurements given by Verne have been converted from the metric system to the English system, and the narration has been translated into the past tense." Michael Orthofer critiqued the edition at his Complete Review website, writing that the original was "apparently one of the first examples of a novel written in the third-person and the present tense – yet surely these should count as additional reasons to try to recreate that in English..." Professor Arthur Bruce Evans of DePauw University reviewed the Noiset translation favorably, describing her prose as an example of "[t]he fine art of translating—blending textual faithfulness with discursive fluidity..." Evans noted the "regrettable lack of illustrations" in the 2015 edition, as compared to the Verne octavo which held approximately 80 illustrations by Léon Benett.

References

External links
 Standard Island (Book), reconstructions of the flags described in the novel at the Flags of the World website

See also 
 1895 in science fiction

1895 French novels
1895 science fiction novels
Novels by Jules Verne
Novels set on islands
Novels set in San Francisco
Novels set in San Diego
Fictional floating islands
Artificial islands
Novels set in Oceania
Nautical novels